is a Japanese manga series, based on Taichi Yamada's novel of the same title, and illustrated by Hideki Arai. It was serialized in Shogakukan's seinen manga magazine Monthly Ikki from October 2013 to August 2014, with its chapters collected in a single volume.

Publication
Written by Taichi Yamada, the Kūya Shōnin ga Ita novel was published by the Asahi Shimbun Publishing on April 7, 2011. The manga adaptation, illustrated by Hideki Arai, was serialized in Shogakukan's seinen manga magazine Monthly Ikki from October 25, 2013, to August 25, 2014. Shogakukan collected its chapters in a single tankōbon volume, released on September 30, 2014.

Reception
In 2015, the manga adaptation won the Manga Honz Super New Award 2014 by the Japanese book recommendation website Honz.

References

Further reading

External links
 

2011 Japanese novels
Manga based on novels
Seinen manga
Shogakukan manga